Emily Coutts is a Canadian actress. She is known for portraying Keyla Detmer, a bridge officer, on the Paramount+ series Star Trek: Discovery.

A graduate of York University's drama program, Coutts has written, produced, and starred in several independent short and feature films. She has also appeared in a web series that she co-wrote and co-produced, entitled Beattie & Mae, alongside Melanie Leishman.

Personal life 
Coutts came out as gay in 2019. In August 2020, she announced her engagement to her girlfriend, producer Lexy Altman.

Filmography

Film

Television

References

External links 
 

1989 births
Canadian LGBT actors
Living people
Canadian television actresses
York University alumni
Queer actresses
Queer women